The Meadowlands Environment Center (formerly the Hackensack Meadowlands Environmental Center) is an educational facility in the New Jersey Meadowlands in Lyndhurst, New Jersey. It is currently operated by Ramapo College of New Jersey. Ramapo College operates the center under the auspices of the New Jersey Sports and Exposition Authority as of the February, 2015, when legislation placed the New Jersey Meadowlands Commission which pioneered the center, under the New Jersey Sports and Exposition Authority's control.

The center is at the Richard W. DeKorte Park, named after Richard W. DeKorte, a resident of Franklin Lakes, New Jersey, who as majority leader of the New Jersey General Assembly sponsored legislation that established the commission.

It is home to an observatory.

See also

Hackensack RiverWalk
List of crossings of the Hackensack River

References

External links
Meadowlands Environment Center

New Jersey Meadowlands District
Buildings and structures in Bergen County, New Jersey
Nature centers in New Jersey
Tourist attractions in Bergen County, New Jersey
Protected areas of Bergen County, New Jersey
Education in Bergen County, New Jersey